The 2011–12 CONCACAF Champions League is the 4th edition of the CONCACAF Champions League under its current format, and overall the 47th edition of the premier football club competition organized by CONCACAF, the regional governing body of North America, Central America and the Caribbean. The tournament began on July 26, 2011 and finished with the second leg of the final April 25, 2012.

Defending champions Monterrey won the title, and qualified as the CONCACAF representative at the 2012 FIFA Club World Cup.

Qualification

Twenty-four teams participated in the 2011–12 CONCACAF Champions League from the North American, Central American, and Caribbean zones. Nine of the teams came from North America, twelve from Central America, and three from the Caribbean.

Teams could be disqualified and replaced by a team from a different country if the club didn't have an available stadium that met CONCACAF regulations for safety. If a club's own stadium failed to meet the set standards then it could find a suitable replacement stadium within its own country. However, if it was still determined that the club could not provide the adequate facilities then it ran the risk of being replaced.

North America
A total of nine clubs from the North American Football Union participated in the Champions League. Mexico and the United States were allocated four spots, the most of any CONCACAF nation, while Canada was granted one spot in the tournament.

In Mexico, the winners of the Mexican Primera División Apertura and Clausura tournaments earned direct berths into the Group Stage of the Champions League, while the tournament runners-up earned berths into the preliminary round.

For the United States, three of its four spots were allocated through the Major League Soccer regular season and playoffs, while the fourth spot was allocated to the winner of the domestic cup competition, the U.S. Open Cup. The U.S. Open Cup winner, along with the MLS Cup runner-up, earned berths into the preliminary round of the tournament. The winner of the Supporters' Shield and MLS Cup were given byes into the Group Stage.

The winners of Canada's domestic cup competition, the Canadian Championship, earned the lone Canadian berth into the tournament, entering in the preliminary round.

Central America
Twelve clubs from the Central American Football Union qualified to the Champions League. If one or more clubs was precluded, it was supplanted by a club from another Central American federation. The reallocation would be based on results from previous Champions League tournaments.

For the Central American representatives that qualified via split seasons, in nations that played a playoff to determine a national champion, the winners gained the nation's top spot. In nations that didn't utilize such methods, total points over both seasons, followed by other tiebreakers, determined which team gained the nation's top spot. The top teams from the leagues of Costa Rica, Honduras, Guatemala and Panama entered the Group Stage, while their second teams entered the preliminary round. The two teams from the league of El Salvador and the sole representatives from the leagues of Nicaragua and Belize entered the preliminary round.

Caribbean
Three berths in the Champions League's Preliminary Round were allocated to the top three finishers of the CFU Club Championship, a subcontinental tournament for clubs from nations of the Caribbean Football Union. In order for a Caribbean club to qualify for the CFU Club Championship, they needed to finish as the champions (or in some cases, runners-up) in their respective nation's top league in the previous season.

If any Caribbean club was precluded, it was supplanted by the fourth-place finisher from the CFU Club Championship.

Teams
Teams in bold qualified directly for the Group Stage.

Number of appearances and last appearance count only those in the Champions League era starting from 2008–09 (not counting those in the era of the Champions' Cup from 1962 to 2008).

1 Berth originally awarded to Belize (Belize Defence Force) but Belize failed CONCACAF stadium requirements, so the spot vacated was awarded to Honduras (Olimpia) based on performance from last season.

Format
Like the previous editions, the tournament is divided into three phases:
In the preliminary round, 16 teams are drawn into eight two-legged home-and-away ties, with each tie containing one team from Pot A and one team from Pot B. The eight winners qualify for the Group Stage to join the eight teams which directly enter the Group Stage.
In the Group Stage, 16 teams are drawn into four groups of four playing in a round-robin home-and-away format, with each group containing two direct entries (one team from Pot A and one team from Pot B) and two Preliminary Round winners. The top two teams from each group advance to the Quarterfinals of the Championship Round.
In the Championship Round, the eight teams play in a knockout tournament, with each tie played in two-legged home-and-away format.

Teams from the same association (excluding "wildcard" teams which replace a team from another association) may not be drawn with each other in the preliminary round and Group Stage, but may be drawn with each other in the Championship Round, where the only restriction is that in the quarterfinals, a group winner has to be drawn with the runner-up of another group and also host the second leg.

For the two-legged ties of the preliminary round and Championship Round, the away goals rule is used, but not after a tie enters extra time, and so a tie is decided by penalty shootout if the aggregate score is level after extra time.

Schedule

Preliminary round

The draw for the preliminary round and the Group Stage was held on May 18, 2011. The first legs of the preliminary round were played July 26–28, 2011, while the second legs were played August 2–4, 2011.

|}

Group stage

The Group Stage were played in 6 matchdays during August–October 2011: August 16–18, August 23–25, September 13–15, September 20–22, September 27–29, and October 18–20. The top two teams of each group advanced to the Championship Round.

Group A

Group B

Group C

Group D

Championship round

Bracket
The draw for the Championship Round was held on November 8, 2011. In the quarterfinals, the group winners were assured of playing the second leg at home, and were drawn against the group runners-up, with the only restriction being that they could not face the same team that they played in the Group Stage (and thus they could face a team from the same association).

Quarter-finals
The first legs of the quarter-finals were played March 6–8, 2012, and the second legs were played March 13–15, 2012.

|}

Semi-finals
The first legs of the semi-finals were played March 28, 2012, and the second legs were played April 4, 2012.

|}

Final

The first leg of the final was played April 18, 2012, and the second leg was played April 25, 2012.

|}

Top goalscorers

Source:

Awards
For the first time, CONCACAF awarded a Golden Boot trophy to the top scorer and a Golden Ball trophy to the player of the tournament. Humberto Suazo won the Golden Boot over Oribe Peralta by the tie-breaker of scoring more goals over the two-leg final. Oribe Peralta won the Golden Ball, determined by a combination of fan and media votes.

References

External links
 CONCACAF Champions League official website

 
1
CONCACAF Champions League seasons